Augustin Cochin may refer to:
Augustin Cochin (politician) (1823–1872), French politician and writer
Augustin Cochin (historian) (1876–1916), French historian and grandson of the prior